Filip Zadina (born 27 November 1999) is a Czech professional ice hockey forward currently playing with the Detroit Red Wings of the National Hockey League (NHL). Zadina was drafted 6th overall by the Red Wings in the 2018 NHL Entry Draft.

Playing career
Zadina made his Czech Extraliga debut playing with HC Dynamo Pardubice during the 2015–16 Czech Extraliga season.

Zadina was selected 10th overall by the Halifax Mooseheads in the 2017 CHL Import Draft. He committed to the Mooseheads believing they would help him achieve his dream of playing in the NHL. He led all rookies in points, was named to the First All-Star Team, the All-Rookie Team, and won the Michael Bossy Trophy as the best professional prospect in the league.

Prior to the draft Zadina was considered a top prospect, with NHL Central Scouting Bureau describing him as a natural scorer with a great finishing touch. He was the third ranked North American based skater, before he was selected sixth overall in the 2018 NHL Entry Draft by the Detroit Red Wings on 22 June 2018. He soon agreed to a three-year, entry-level contract with the Red Wings on 7 July 2018. After attending Red Wings training camp prior to the 2018–19 season, Zadina was reassigned to the Grand Rapids Griffins in the American Hockey League on 30 September. On 16 February 2019, in a game against the San Antonio Rampage, Zadina scored eight seconds into overtime, setting the Griffins franchise record for fastest overtime goal.

On 23 February 2019, Zadina was recalled by the Red Wings. Prior to being recalled, he recorded 15 goals and 16 assists in 45 games with the Griffins, ranking third on the team in goals and fourth in points. He made his NHL debut for the Red Wings the next day in a game against the San Jose Sharks. On 5 March, he scored his first career NHL goal in his fourth NHL game, against Semyon Varlamov of the Colorado Avalanche. On 15 March, Zadina was assigned to the Griffins. He recorded one goal and two assists in nine games with the Red Wings, and averaged 15:23 of ice time. On 24 November 2019, Zadina was again recalled by the Red Wings. On 11 December 2019 Zadina, was reassigned to the Grand Rapids Griffins (AHL).

On 7 August 2020, with the 2020–21 NHL season delayed due to the COVID-19 pandemic, Zadina having trained in the off-season with HC Oceláři Třinec was loaned by the Red Wings to join the Czech ELH club for the beginning of their season until the resumption of the Red Wings training camp in November.

Personal life

Career statistics

Regular season and playoffs

International

Awards and honours

References

External links

1999 births
Czech ice hockey forwards
Detroit Red Wings draft picks
Detroit Red Wings players
Grand Rapids Griffins players
Halifax Mooseheads players
HC Dynamo Pardubice players
HC Oceláři Třinec players
Living people
National Hockey League first-round draft picks
Sportspeople from Pardubice
Czech expatriate ice hockey players in Canada
Czech expatriate ice hockey players in the United States